Tenzin Gyatso the 14th Dalai Lama made his first foreign visit in exile to Japan and Thailand in 1967. In 1973, he made his first visit to Europe. He made his first visit to the North America in 1979. Following is a list of all of his overseas trips.

List

References

Overseas visits
Politics-related lists
Lists of diplomatic trips
Diplomatic visits